Duel with Samurai is a 1971 Hong Kong wuxia film directed by Chin Sheng-en and stars Chan Hung-lit as a Rōnin who arrives in China during the Ming dynasty, causing havoc among the martial world. The film was released on 3 September 1971 in Taiwan, and five days later on 8 September 1971 in Hong Kong

Plot 
During the Ming dynasty in China, the coastal areas were rampant. A Wokou who refers himself as the Nippon Ronin (Chan Hung-lit), colludes with the coastal local tyrants of Fujian and Zhejiang Provinces, along with cult religious groups. They occupy Baiyunzhuang and plundered everywhere. Young warrior Fan Chen-tung (Kong Ban) leads a resistance group to retaliate which prompts the Chinese martial world to share the same hatred against the Japanese and tyrants.

Cast
Chan Hung-lit as The Nippon Rōnin

Kong Ban as Fan Chen-tung
Chiang Ching-hsia
Yen Chung
Yu Chung-chiu
Su Chen-ping
Su Chin-lung
Chen Shih-wei
Chin Wan-che
Cheung Yee-kwai
Tong Fuk-hung
Wong Cheung
Xiao Yang
Chiang Tao
Yeung Fui-yuk
Wong Fei-lung
Lee Keung
Cheung Siu-kwan
Ho Wai-hung
Wong Hoi

Crew
Action Director: Chen Shih-wei, Yu Tien-lung
Production Manager: Tsu Kang
Presenter: Cheung Chung-lung

References

External links

1971 films
1971 action films
1971 martial arts films
Hong Kong martial arts films
Taiwanese martial arts films
Wuxia films
Kung fu films
Karate films
Samurai films
Pirate films
1970s Mandarin-language films
Films set in the Ming dynasty
Films shot in Taiwan
1970s Hong Kong films
1970s Japanese films